Mendy Portnoy is an English-born Israeli singer, pianist, composer, and producer. He is best known as half of the folk rock duo the Portnoy Brothers with his older sibling Sruli. He has also released two albums as a solo artist.

Early life
Portnoy was born in Manchester, England, one of nine children. His father is a rabbi and former orchestra conductor. He and five other siblings made aliyah to Israel as adults.

He and his brother Sruli studied music from a young age and began playing together around age 14. He originally took guitar lessons, with Sruli taking piano, before the two switched.

Career
In 2010, he performed at the Complete Unity Concert at Heichal Shlomo alongside Aharit Hayamim, Shtar, and JudaBlue. He and Sruli participated in the music video "Waving Flags", performed by campers and volunteer staff at Camp Simcha.

Mendy Portnoy was featured on composer Yossi Green's 2015 album Pianesque. That same year, he collaborated with singer and saxophonist Daniel Zamir on Esa Einai, an album of Shlomo Carlebach songs, and released a short online-only piano album entitled Holy Days.

He was the final keyboardist for the Jewish rock band Hamakor, performing on their 2014 single "Lift Me Up".

Portnoy Brothers

Mendy and Sruli Portnoy began collaborating as the Portnoy Brothers in 2012 with their debut single "Kol Ha'olam". They received further attention in 2014 with their single and music video "Learn to Love". An album of the same name was released in 2016.

Other activities
In addition to music, Portnoy is also a professional editor and photographer and was Ezra Kress's rotator at camp simcha special from 2010-2011.

Discography

With Hamakor
"Lift Me Up" (single) (2014)

With Portnoy Brothers

Learn to Love (2016)

Solo albums
Esa Einai: Mendy Portnoy Plays Shlomo Carlebach (with Daniel Zamir) (15 February 2015)
Holy Days (7 September 2015)
“Introspection: Mendy Portnoy (with Avraham Balti) (September 2020)

As featured artist
Yossi Green, Pianesque (2015)

Other credits
Yerachmiel, "Acheinu" (2014) – piano, arrangement
Sarah Dukes, "Raining Rockets" (2015) – piano

References

Living people
British emigrants to Israel
Musicians from Manchester
Jewish singers
Jewish composers
British rock pianists
British rock singers
Jewish rock musicians
Hamakor (band) members
British Jews
21st-century pianists
Year of birth missing (living people)